The 2018–19 FA Women's National League Cup is the 29th running of the competition, which began in 1991. It is the major League Cup competition run by the FA Women's National League, and for the sixth season it is being run in conjunction with their secondary League Cup competition, the National League Plate.

Seventy of the seventy-one National League clubs entered at the competition in the Determining round, with the winners continuing into the competition proper and the losers going into the National League Plate tournament. The only exception were Larkhall Athletic who were granted a bye into the first round proper of the cup. The previous two tournaments were both won by Blackburn Rovers, but after winning promotion to the FA Women's Championship in the summer of 2019 they did not take part in the competition this season.

Due to the COVID-19 pandemic, the final was not held and no winners were named.

Results
All results listed are published by The Football Association. Games are listed by round in date order, and then in alphabetical order of the home team where matches were played on the same day.

The division each team play in is indicated in brackets after their name: (S)=Southern Division; (N)=Northern Division; (SW1)=Division One South West; (SE1)=Division One South East; (M1)=Division One Midlands; (N1)=Division One North.

Determining round
The competition began with a Determining Round, which consisted of 70 teams in the FA Women's National League being drawn in pairs. The winners of these 35 games progress to the next stage of the competition, while the losers qualify for the 2019–20 FA Women's National League Plate.

Northern section

Southern section

Preliminary round

Northern section

Southern section

First round

Northern section

Southern section

Second round

Northern section

Southern section

Quarter-finals

Northern section

Southern section

Semi-finals

Final

References

FA Women's National League Cup
National League Cup
FA Women's National League, 2019-20